Oak Park 92105 is an independent studio album and eleventh release overall by American gospel music singer Tonéx. It was released under independent label Nureau Ink in 2003 and was a hard-to-find underground release which was later re-released in 2006 on iTunes. The album carries the name of "first Christian-based explicit album". The 2003 version of Oak Park 92105 had the 4 different songs "Flow", "Let's Stay In Love", "Total Praise" and "One Sunday Morning".

Track listing
Disc 1
 California
 Santa Margarita
 Checkmate
 Anthony
 Chollas Parkway
 U Need The Master
 Can't U See?
 Alrite (Version 4.0)
 Tippy (featuring Rhonda Patton)
 My Friend (featuring Chizmatonic)
 Good 2 Me (featuring Glenn McKinney Sr)
 Natural

Disc 2
 I Found Love
 Insanity
 The Blue Mood Ring
 Now
 Out The Game (featuring Gibraan)
 When My Words R Few
 Feelings (featuring Karen Carpenter)
 Easier Said Than Done
 Pain
 Sometimes
 Yahtzee
 Yes (featuring Montell Jordan)

External links
 PraiseNet Review
 Tonex: Oak Park 92105 on GospelFlava.com
 "Tonex Releases 'Oak Park: 92105' Via iTunes", Christian Post
Review, music-reviewer.com
Review, Nuthinbutgospel.com
"Tonex", San Diego Weekly Reader

Tonéx albums
2003 albums
2005 albums